Indian Telly Award for Best Anchor is an award given by Indiantelevision.com as part of its annual Indian Telly Awards for TV serials, to recognize a person who has hosted a television reality show and been appreciated by the Indian audience.

Superlatives

List of winners (Popular)

2000s
2001 Not Awarded
2002 Amitabh Bachchan - Kaun Banega Crorepati 
Annu Kapoor - Closeup Antakshari 
Harsha Bhogle - Harsha Online 
Aman Verma - Khullja Sim Sim 
Jaaved Jaffrey - Boogie Woogie
Sonali Bendre - Kya Masti Kya Dhoom 
Sachin Pilgaonkar - Chalti Ka Naam Antakshari
Karan Thapar - Face To Face India
2003 Farooque Shaikh - Jeena Isi Ka Naam Hai 
Aman Verma - Khullja Sim Sim
Simi Garewal - Rendezvous with Simi Garewal 
Annu Kapoor - Antakshari  
Pallavi Joshi - Antakshari 
Rajat Sharma - Aaj Ki Baat 
2004 Shekhar Suman - Carry On Shekhar 
Farooque Shaikh - Jeena Isi Ka Naam Hai
Shaan - Sa Re Ga Ma Pa
Karan Thapar - Court Martial 
Barkha Dutt - Various shows on NDTV 24x7
2005 Amitabh Bachchan - Kaun Banega Crorepati 2 
Karan Johar - Koffee with Karan 
Pooja Bedi - Just Pooja 
Shaan - Sa Re Ga Ma Pa
Aman Verma & Mini Mathur - Indian Idol 1
2006 Shaan - Sa Re Ga Ma Pa Challenge 2005 
Lola Kutty - Lola TV 
Pooja Bedi - Just Pooja 
Ravi Behl & Naved Jaffery - Boogie Woogie
Barkha Dutt - We The People
2007 Shahrukh Khan - Kaun Banega Crorepati 3  
Aditya Narayan - Sa Re Ga Ma Pa Challenge 2007 
Shaan - Amul Star Voice of India 
Karan Johar - Koffee with Karan 2   
Lola Kutty - Lola TV
2008 Salman Khan - Dus Ka Dum  
Shaan - Amul Star Voice of India 
Ravi Behl & Naved Jaffery - Boogie Woogie 
Karan Singh Grover & Shweta Gulati - Zara Nachke Dikha 
Akshay Kumar - Fear Factor: Khatron Ke Khiladi 
Shahrukh Khan - Kya Aap Paanchvi Pass Se Tez Hain? 
2009 Rajeev Khandelwal - Sacch Ka Saamna 
Kiran Bedi - Aap Ki Kachehri 
Salman Khan - Dus Ka Dum 2 
Akshay Kumar - Fear Factor: Khatron Ke Khiladi  
Farhan Akhtar - Oye! It's Friday!

2010s

2010 Ravi Behl & Naved Jaffery - Boogie Woogie 
Manish Paul - Dance India Dance Li'l Masters 
Jay Bhanushali & Saumya Tandon - Dance India Dance (season 2) 
Hussain Kuwajerwala - Indian Idol 5 
Ronit Roy - Kitchen Champion
2011 No Award
2012 Amitabh Bachchan - Kaun Banega Crorepati 5 
Ayushman Khurana - Just Dance 
Jay Bhanushali & Saumya Tandon - Dance India Dance (season 3)
Karan Johar - Koffee with Karan 3 
Priety Zinta - Guinness World Records- Ab India Todega
2013 Manish Paul - Jhalak Dikhhla Jaa 6  
Anup Soni - Crime Patrol 
Salman Khan - Bigg Boss 6 
Aamir Khan - Satyamev Jayate
Amitabh Bachchan - Kaun Banega Crorepati 6
2014 Manish Paul & Kapil Sharma - Jhalak Dikhhla Jaa Season 7
Jay Bhanushali - Dance India Dance Super Mom 
Karan Wahi & Gautam Rode - Nach Baliye 6Rannvijay Singh-  MTV Roadies X1 - Ride For RespectSalman Khan - Bigg Boss 7Rohit Shetty - Fear Factor: Khatron Ke Khiladi (season 5)''
2019 Manish Paul - Indian Idol
2021 Aditya Narayan - Indian Idol 12
Rohit Shetty - Fear Factor: Khatron Ke Khiladi 11
Ranveer Singh - The Big Picture
Rithvik Dhanjani & Paritosh Tripathi - Super Dancer 4
Salman Khan - Bigg Boss 15
Raghav Juyal - Dance Deewane 3
Raghav Juyal - Dance+6

References

Indian Telly Awards